Orbitsville Departure is a novel by Bob Shaw published in 1983.

Plot summary
Orbitsville Departure is a novel which is a sequel to Orbitsville.

Reception
Dave Pringle reviewed Orbitsville Departure for Imagine magazine, and stated that "It does not hold up as well as the earlier book, suffering from a rather rushed denouement which ought to have boggled the mind but for some reason did not. Nevertheless Shaw is the most readable of writers and like all his books this one entertains."

Reviews
Review by Paul Kincaid (1983) in Vector 117
Review by Richard E. Geis (1985) in Science Fiction Review, Summer 1985
Review by Gene DeWeese (1985) in Science Fiction Review, Fall 1985
Review by Don D'Ammassa (1985) in Science Fiction Chronicle, #75 December 1985
Review by Chris Amies (1991) in Vector 164

References

1983 novels